A Dotted Line is the fourth major album release and sixth studio album overall by progressive acoustic trio Nickel Creek. Produced by Eric Valentine, the album was released on Nonesuch Records on April 1, 2014, in the United States.

A Dotted Line is the first Nickel Creek album since the band's hiatus following their 2007 Farewell (For Now) Tour. The release coincided with the trio's 25th anniversary. A subsequent tour was also scheduled to begin in April.

Tracks include initial singles "Destination" and "Love of Mine," as well as two covers: Sam Phillips' "Where Is Love Now" and Mother Mother's "Hayloft."

Critical reception

A Dotted Line garnered critical acclaim. At Metacritic, they assign a "weighted average" rating called a Metascore to albums based upon the ratings and reviews by selected independent publications, and the album's score is an 82 out of 100, which means the album received "universal acclaim". At Allmusic, Stephen Thomas Erlewine rated the album three-and-a-half stars out of five, stating that even "If there isn't much spark, there is a surplus of warmth; the trio is comfortable and relaxed, and it's hard not to succumb to such friendly, familiar vibes." Brian Mansfield of USA Today rated the album three-and-a-half stars out of four stars, writing how on the release the trio "stretch pop parameters with imaginative arrangements." At The Oakland Press, Gary Graff rated the album three-and-a-half out of four stars, saying that the release is "a welcome return from a hiatus well-spent." About.com's Kim Ruehl rated the album four-and-a-half stars out of five, stating that on the release the trio did "no harm in exploring" musical territory as they seek to "push the evolution of music by starting with tradition and taking it somewhere some folks may say it has no business going."

At Paste, Holly Gleason rated the album 8.2 out of ten, writing that the release is "Not merely a product of maturity, Nickel Creek has grown without losing its palpable joy or wondrous ability to make musicianship as accessible as the engaging way their voices draw listeners to them." Brice Ezell rated the album eight out of ten discs, stating that the release "is a work of supreme songcraft; one might call it a 'return to form', but from the sound of it, the form was never gone in the first place." At The A.V. Club, Genevieve Koski graded the album a B+, saying how the release is "a ready-made best-of album, superb in execution but light on surprises". Sarah Rodman of The Boston Globe gave a positive review of the album, remarking how the release "is a vibrant reminder of Nickel Creek's youthful promise and proof that it has plenty left to say." At Relix, Kiran Herbert gave a positive review, observing that "there's not a song on the album that falls short."

Track listing
All tracks written by Chris Thile, Sara Watkins, and Sean Watkins unless noted.

Personnel
Chris Thile - Bouzouki, Mandolin, Vocals
Sara Watkins - Fiddle, Vocals
Sean Watkins - Guitar, Vocals

Additional musicians:
Mark Schatz - Bass
Edgar Meyer - Bowed Bass
Matt Chamberlain - Percussion
Eric Valentine - Percussion

Production
Eric Valentine - Producer, Engineer, Mixing, Mastering
Cian Riordan - Engineer
Justin Long - Studio Assistant

Charts
The album debuted at No. 7 on the Billboard 200 with 27,000 copies sold in its first week in the US. As of May 2014, the album has sold 47,000 copies in the US.

References
 Clean Slate Music - Album review - https://web.archive.org/web/20140224023558/http://cleanslatemusic.org/2014/02/23/album-review-nickel-creek-a-dotted-line-nonesuch-records/
Allmusic - A Dotted Line - Nickel Creek - http://www.allmusic.com/album/a-dotted-line-mw0002629075/credits

External links
 A Dotted Line at Nickel Creek's official website, with sound samples and video

Nickel Creek albums
2014 albums
Albums produced by Eric Valentine
Nonesuch Records albums